Pars-e Jonubi-ye Yek (also Romanized as Pārs-e Jonūbī-ye Yek) is a village in Asaluyeh Rural District, Central District, Asaluyeh County, Bushehr Province, Iran. At the 2006 census, its population was 10,938, in 259 families.

References 

Populated places in Asaluyeh County